Hicham El-Mashtoub (May 11, 1972 – September 16, 2021) was a Lebanese-born Canadian gridiron football center who played two seasons with the Houston Oilers of the National Football League. He was drafted by the Houston Oilers in the sixth round of the 1995 NFL Draft and by the Edmonton Eskimos in an opening bonus round of the 1995 CFL Draft. He played college football at the University of Arizona and attended Saint-Maxime high school in Montreal, Quebec, where he was raised. El-Mashtoub was also a member of the Edmonton Eskimos of the Canadian Football League, where he played one season. He died of cancer in September 2021, at the age of 49.

References

External links
Just Sports Stats

1972 births
2021 deaths
Players of Canadian football from Quebec
American football centers
Canadian football offensive linemen
Lebanese players of American football
Lebanese players of Canadian football
Arizona Wildcats football players
Houston Oilers players
Edmonton Elks players
Sportspeople from Montreal
Lebanese emigrants to Canada
Sportspeople of Lebanese descent
Deaths from cancer in Quebec